The Golden World Awards for Excellence in PR is an annual global awards ceremony organised by the International Public Relations Association to recognise public relations achievements around the world . Established in 1990, the Golden World Awards (the "Oscars of PR") has 37 categories of In-house and Agency entries judged separately, and honours the overall highest standards of each year with the IPRA Grand Prix for Excellence. There is also a special Global Contribution Award for an entry meeting one of the UN's 17 Sustainable Development Goals.

Entry criteria

In Round 1 the jury considers programme summaries. There is an overall limit of 1800 words, and separate limits for each of the 6 Criteria. Entries must be in English.

All entries are submitted online to the IPRA secretariat and must include a short Overview of the programme. Under separate headlines, each entry then addresses five Criteria:

 Statement of Problem/Opportunity
 Research
 Planning
 Execution
 Outcomes

Finalists from Round 1 are then invited to upload supporting media to assist the judges in the selection of category winners.

Award categories

For each of the 38 categories below Agency and Inhouse entries are judged separately and separate awards made. In addition, the best PR programme each year is awarded the Grand Prix for Excellence.

Arts and entertainment: For a PR campaign in arts or entertainment.
Business-to-business: For a business-to-business PR campaign.
Climate Change: For a PR campaign addressing, issues relevant to, or awareness of, global climate change.
Communication research: For research conducted for the development of business or communication strategies.
Community engagement: For a PR campaign that helped engage a community in some specific way.
Community relations: For a community relations campaign.
Consumer PR for an existing  product: For creative PR activities around a consumer product.
Consumer PR for an existing service: For creative PR activities around a consumer service.
Corporate communications: For excellence in enhancing a company's reputation through communications.
Corporate responsibility: For a PR campaign demonstrating excellence in corporate social responsibility.
Country, region and city: For a PR campaign to promote a country, a region or a city.
Crisis management: For excellent communications management during a crisis.
Crisis communications online: For excellence in the use of social media during a crisis.
Digital media relations: For a PR campaign showing creativity in its use of social media.
Environmental: For a PR campaign on an environmental or ecological issue. 
Event management: For the planning and delivery of a successful event with a PR dimension.
Financial services and investor relations: For use of PR for a financial product or service or in investor relations.
Food and beverage: For a PR campaign to promote a new or existing food or beverage.
Gaming and virtual reality: For a PR campaign that launched a development in the gaming or VR industry.
Healthcare: For a PR campaign in the pharmaceutical or healthcare industry.
Influencer management: For a PR campaign that made use of identified influencers beyond traditional media.
Integration of traditional and new media: For the creative integration of traditional and social media in a PR campaign.
Internal communications: For a creative internal communications campaign that engaged personnel.
International campaign: For a coordinated PR campaign in more than one country.
Launch of a new product: For creative PR activities around the launch of a product
Launch of a new service: For creative PR activities around the launch of a service.
Media relations: For a PR campaign which showed impressive media reach.
NGO campaign: For a PR campaign by a charity or non-governmental organisation.
PR on a shoestring: For a creative PR campaign on a small budget.
Public affairs: For lobbying that influenced or changed public policy.
Public sector: For creative use of PR by a public sector body.
Publications: For a creative PR publication in print or electronic format.
Reputation and brand management: For the creative positioning of a company image or brand.
Social media: For a PR campaign demonstrating imaginative use of social media.
Sponsorship: For a PR campaign that promoted awareness of sponsorship of an event or activity.
Sport: For a PR campaign to promote a sport for itself or to a community.
Technology:For a creative PR campaign in the technology sector.
Travel & tourism: For a PR campaign in the transport, travel, hotel or tourism industries.

Grand Prix for Excellence Winners

2022 
Tencent Weixin Pay,  China

One for All Love Meal Program

2021 
Te Taura Whiri i te Reo Māori, New Zealand

Te Wā Tuku Reo Māori - The Māori Language Moment

2020 
LLYC, Spain

The last older person to die in loneliness

2019 
Dentsu Public Relations Inc, Japan

Kobayashi City Department of SimCity BuildIt

2018
FleishmanHillardVanguard and Orta, Russia

Aeroflot's Sulimov dogs

2017 
Weber Shandwick, UK

The alphabet of illiteracy

2016
FleishmanHillard / Royal Philips, Ireland

Philips breathless choir

2015
Atmosphere Communications, South Africa

Sanlam one rand man

2014
Nanyang Technological University, Singapore

A global university on the rise

2013
Turkcell, Turkey

Women Empowerment in Economy

2012
Blumen Group, Serbia

The list is a note for the future

2011
Absa, South Africa

Absa rings the bell

References

External links
 IPRA official website

Awards established in 1990
Public relations
Business and industry awards